Corey Gipson (born January 22, 1981) is an American basketball coach who is the current head coach of the Austin Peay Governors men's basketball team.

Playing career
Gipson played his first two years at Three Rivers Community College in Poplar Bluff, Missouri before transferring to Austin Peay where he was part of two Governors Ohio Valley Conference regular season titles, including the 2003 OVC tournament title for a berth in the NCAA tournament.

Coaching career
After graduating, Gipson started his coaching career as an assistant at Virginia State from 2005 to 2009 before joining the staff at UNC Greensboro where he would coach under both Mike Dement and Wes Miller. Gipson would return to his alma mater as an assistant coach from 2012 to 2015, then become an assistant coach at Missouri State in 2016.

Northwestern State

On March 21, 2022, Gipson was named the 10th coach in Northwestern State's history, replacing the retiring Mike McConathy.

Austin Peay

Gipson returned to Austin Peay on March 12, 2023 to become their head coach, replacing Nate James.

Head coaching record

References

Living people
1981 births
American men's basketball coaches
Northwestern State Demons basketball coaches
Missouri State Bears basketball coaches
Austin Peay Governors men's basketball coaches
UNC Greensboro Spartans men's basketball coaches
Virginia State Trojans men's basketball coaches
Austin Peay Governors men's basketball players
Junior college men's basketball players in the United States
People from Sikeston, Missouri
Basketball coaches from Missouri
Basketball players from Missouri